The Rothschild banking family of France is a French banking dynasty founded in 1812 in Paris (at the time in the First French Empire) by James Mayer de Rothschild (1792–1868). James was sent there from his home in Frankfurt, Germany, by his father, Mayer Amschel Rothschild (1744–1812). Wanting his sons to succeed on their own and to expand the family business across Europe, Mayer Amschel Rothschild had his eldest son remain in Frankfurt, while his four other sons were sent to different European cities to establish a financial institution to invest in business and provide banking services. Endogamy within the family was an essential part of the Rothschild strategy in order to ensure control of their wealth remained in family hands.

Involvement in finance and industry
Through their collaborative efforts, the Rothschilds rose to prominence in a variety of banking endeavors including loans, government bonds and trading in bullion. Their financing afforded investment opportunities and during the 19th century, they became major stakeholders in large-scale mining and rail transport ventures that were fundamental to the rapidly expanding industrial economies of Europe. In partnership with N M Rothschild & Sons of England, they owned Chemin de Fer du Nord railway in France that ran from their Gare du Nord station in Paris to the English Channel. In addition, the Rothschilds in France became leaders in the wine growing industry. By the later part of the 19th century, oil was fast becoming an important commodity and the French bank was heavily involved in oil exploration in the Baku area of present-day Azerbaijan through their company, the Caspian and Black Sea Oil Industry and Trade Society established in 1883. Their investment proved to be a lucrative one and by the turn of the century, the various oil companies in Azerbaijan were producing more oil than any other country in the world. In 1898, the Rothschilds established the Mazut Transportation Society that developed a fleet of oil tankers operating in the Caspian Sea. In 1911, the Royal Dutch Shell company purchased the Azerbaijan oil fields from the Rothschild family.

The French Revolution in 1789 brought positive changes for French Jews, resulting in their full emancipation in 1791. In 1806, Napoleon I ordered the convening of a "Grand Sanhedrin" in Paris and in 1808 he organized the "Consistoire central des Israélites de France", the administrative agency for all French Jews. The consistorial system made Judaism a recognized religion and placed it under government control. This Consistoire has been a functioning body ever since, except under the Nazi occupation of France during World War II. By tradition, the Central Consistoire has had a member of the Rothschild family as its president.

Jacob Mayer Rothschild, the youngest son, settled in Paris in 1812 where his name Jacob was translated to James. In 1817, he formally created the bank, de Rothschild Frères whose partners were brothers Amschel of Germany, James of France, Carl of Naples, Nathan of England and Salomon of Austria. Highly successful as lenders and investors, the Paris operation also became bankers for Leopold I of Belgium. In 1822 the influential James and his four brothers were awarded the hereditary title of "Baron" by Emperor Francis I of Austria.

Following the July Revolution of 1830 that saw Louis-Philippe come to power in France, James de Rothschild put together the loan package to stabilize the finances of the new government and a second loan in 1834. In recognition of his services to the nation, King Louis-Philippe elevated James to a Grand Officer of the Legion of Honor. According to the records, in 1815 the capital of the Paris banking house James Mayer de Rothschild founded amounted to £55,000 (equivalent to £ million in ); by 1852 the figure was £3,541,700 (equivalent to £ million in ), and just ten years after his death, £16,914,000 (equivalent to £ billion in ). There is a theory that before Louis-Phillipe came to power the Rothschilds were fronting for the House of Orleans. A major portion of the business has consisted of selling French government bonds to French investors through London to protect their anonymity. There was a general perception on the part of the French that otherwise their government might unilaterally reset terms.
No French fortune was more likely to face the problem than the younger branch of the royal family. The theory follows that when the Orleanists came to power they became less provident but by then the Rothschilds had numerous other clients.

The de Rothschild Frères banking business was passed down to ensuing generations. Run by his sons Gustave and Alphonse, during the Franco-Prussian War the bank put together a syndicate that raised the five billion francs the country was obliged to pay Prussia under the terms of the 1871 armistice. James Mayer de Rothschild had stipulated "that the three branches of the family descended from him always be represented." For the next two generations that was the case but in 1939, Edouard Alphonse de Rothschild and cousin Robert-Philippe-Gustave de Rothschild, incompatible with their other cousin Maurice de Rothschild, bought out his share. Maurice went on to be enormously successful and, having inherited a fortune from the childless Adolph Carl von Rothschild of the Naples branch of the family, he moved to Geneva, Switzerland and perpetuated the new Swiss branch of the family.

In 1873 de Rothschild Frères in France and N M Rothschild & Sons of London joined with other investors to acquire the Spanish government's money-losing Rio Tinto copper mines. The new owners restructured the company and turned it into a profitable business. By 1905, the Rothschild interest in Rio Tinto amounted to more than 30 percent. In 1887, the French and English Rothschild banking houses lent money to, and invested in, the De Beers diamond mines in South Africa, becoming its largest shareholders.

In 1953, future President of France, Georges Pompidou, joined de Rothschild Frères and from 1956 to 1962 he served as general manager. In 1962, the Rothschild's created Imétal (now named Imerys), an umbrella company for their considerable mining ventures. Headed by Guy de Rothschild, Imétal looked outward, investing in Great Britain and the United States, a move that put him on the December 20, 1963 cover of Time. In the 1960s, government reform of banking regulations ended the legal distinction between banques d'affaires and deposit banks and in 1967 de Rothschild Frères became Banque Rothschild, a limited-liability company.

A part of the success of the bank that James Rothschild built was through the funding of loans to European governments. This sector of banking began to decline during the latter part of the 19th century following the introduction of new methods for government financing. By 1980, the Paris business employed about 2,000 people and had an annual turnover of 26 billion francs ($5 billion in the currency rates of 1980). But then the Paris business suffered a near death blow in 1981 when the Socialist government of François Mitterrand nationalized and renamed it Compagnie Européenne de Banque. In 1987 a successor company called Rothschild & Cie Banque was created by David René de Rothschild who was joined by his half-brother Edouard de Rothschild and cousin Eric de Rothschild. Capitalized at only $1 million and starting with just three employees, they soon built their tiny investment bank into a major competitor in France and continental Europe. In 2003, following the retirement of Sir Evelyn de Rothschild as head of N M Rothschild & Sons of London, the English and French firms merged into the Group Rothschild under the leadership of David René de Rothschild. In 2006, the French banking division expanded into Brussels, Belgium.

Struggles for the French Rothschilds
In the 1930s, the vast railroad holdings of French Rothschilds were nationalized. The Fall of France greatly affected the French Rothschilds as their bank was seized by the Nazi occupiers. Despite having the bank restored to them at the end of the war, the family bank Rothschild Freres would be nationalized in 1981 by the socialist government of then newly elected French President François Mitterrand.

The French Rothschilds today

Both the British and the French branches emerged from the Second World War with new generations of the family at the helm. Historic partnership ties between the two branches were revitalized, leading to a complete merger in 2003 into Rothschild & Co.

The Rothschilds created their first hedge funds in 1969, and strengthened its position as a world leader in investment banking. Additionally, the firm is a global private bank with over 4,000 private clients in 90 countries.  Rothschild & Co provides a comprehensive range of services to individuals, governments, and corporations worldwide.

Involvement in wine growing
The second French branch was founded by Nathaniel de Rothschild (1812–1870). Born in London, he was the fourth child of the founder of the British branch of the family, Nathan Mayer Rothschild (1777–1836). In 1842, he married Charlotte de Rothschild (1825–1899), daughter of James Mayer de Rothschild and in 1850, they moved to Paris, where he was to work for his father-in-law's bank. However, in 1853 Nathaniel acquired Château Brane Mouton, a vineyard in Pauillac in the Gironde département. Nathaniel Rothschild renamed the estate Château Mouton Rothschild: it would become one of the best-known wine labels in the world.

In 1868, Nathaniel's uncle/father-in-law, James Mayer de Rothschild, acquired the prestigious neighboring vineyard, Château Lafite.

Philanthropy
The French Rothschilds and members of the other branches in Europe were all major contributors to causes in aid of the Jewish people. However, many of their philanthropic efforts extended far beyond Jewish ethnic or religious communities. They built hospitals and shelters, supported cultural institutions and were patrons of individual artists. At present, a research project is underway by The Rothschild Archive  in London to document the family's philanthropic involvements.

Family members

Notable Rothschild family members in France include:

 Alphonse James de Rothschild (1827–1905)
 Aline Caroline de Rothschild (1865–1909)
 Ariane de Rothschild (b. 1965)
 Arthur de Rothschild (1851–1903)
 Béatrice Ephrussi de Rothschild (1864–1934)
 Benjamin de Rothschild (1963–2021)
 Charlotte de Rothschild (1825–1899)
 Bethsabée de Rothschild (1914–1999)
 David René de Rothschild (b. 1942)
 Edmond Adolphe de Rothschild (1926–1997)
 Edmond James de Rothschild (1845–1934)
 Édouard Etienne de Rothschild (b. 1957)
 Edouard Alphonse de Rothschild (1868–1949)
 Elie Robert de Rothschild (1917–2007)
 Elisabeth de Rothschild (1902–1945)
 Guy de Rothschild (1909–2007)
 Hélène de Rothschild (1863-1947)
 Jacqueline Rebecca de Rothschild (1911–2012)
 James Armand de Rothschild (1878–1957)
 James Mayer de Rothschild (1792–1868)
 Marie-Hélène de Rothschild (1927–1996)
 Nadine de Rothschild (b. 1932)
 Nathaniel Robert de Rothschild (b. 1946)
 Nicole de Rothschild (1923-2007)
 Pauline de Rothschild (1908–1976)
 Philippe de Rothschild (1902–1988)
 Philippine de Rothschild (1933–2014)
 Salomon James de Rothschild (1835–1864)
 Saskia de Rothschild (b. 1987)

Rothschild properties
All branches of the Rothschild banking family are famous for their art collections and a number for their palatial estates. Among the Rothschild properties in France were:

 Abbaye des Vaux de Cernay - Cernay-la-Ville, Yvelines
 Château Clarke - Listrac-Médoc, Gironde
 Château de Ferrières - Ferrières-en-Brie, Seine-Maritime
 Château des Fontaines - Chantilly, Oise 
 Château Lafite - Pauillac, Gironde
 Château de Laversine - Saint-Maximin, Oise
 Château des Laurets - Puisseguin, Gironde
 Château Malmaison - Moulis-en-Médoc, Gironde
 Château de Montvillargenne - Gouvieux, Oise
 Château Mouton Rothschild - Pauillac, Gironde
 Château de la Muette - Paris, now the home of the Organisation for Economic Co-operation and Development
 Château d'Armainvilliers, Seine-et-Marne
 Château Rothschild, Boulogne-Billancourt - Boulogne-Billancourt, Hauts-de-Seine
 Haras de Meautry - Touques, Calvados
 Hôtel Lambert - Paris
 Hôtel de Marigny - Paris. Today, a Presidential residence used for State visitors.
 Hôtel de Pontalba - 41 Rue du Faubourg-Saint-Honoré, Paris. Today, the residence for the Ambassadors from the United States
 Hôtel Salomon de Rothschild - Paris
 Talleyrand Building - Paris. Today, the embassy of the United States  
 Château de Vallière - Mortefontaine, Oise
 Villa Ephrussi de Rothschild - Saint-Jean-Cap-Ferrat on the Côte d'Azur
 Villa Rothschild, Cannes - Cannes on the French Riviera

See also

 Rothschild banking family of Austria
 Rothschild banking family of England

 Rothschild banking family of Naples

References

Further reading

  Ferguson, Niall. The House of Rothschild (2 vol, 1998), detailed economic and financial history
 Cassis, Youssef. "Financial Elites in Three European Centres: London, Paris, Berlin, 1880s–1930s." Business History 33.3 (1991): 53–71.
 Cameron, Rondo E. "French Finance and Italian Unity: The Cavourian Decade." The American Historical Review (1957): 552–569. in JSTOR
 Lottman, Herbert R. · The French Rothschilds: The Great Banking Dynasty Through Two Turbulent Centuries (New York: Crown Publishers, 1995) 416 pp. 
 Heuberger, George. The Rothschilds: Essays on the History of a European Family (Rochester, NY: Boydell and Brewer, Inc., 1994). 420 pp. 
 Plessis, Alain. "The history of banks in France." Handbook on the History of European Banks (1994) pp: 185–296.

 The Rothschilds; a Family Portrait by Frederic Morton. Atheneum Publishing (1962)  (1998 reprint)
 The Rothschilds, a Family of Fortune by Virginia Cowles. Alfred A. Knopf (1973)  
 Baron James: The Rise of the French Rothschilds by Anka Muhlstein. Rizzoli International Publications (1983) 
 Mouton Rothschild: Paintings for the Labels 1945-1981 by Philippine de Rothschild. Little, Brown and Company (1983) 
 The Whims of Fortune: The Memoirs of Guy de Rothschild by Guy de Rothschild Random House (1985) 
 A History of the Jews by Paul M. Johnson (1987) HarperCollins Publishers 
 Rothschild: The Wealth and Power of a Dynasty by Derek Wilson. Scribner, London (1988) 
 Writings by University of Florida professor of history Harry W. Paul
Edmond de Rothschild, The Man who redeemed the Holy Land (Edmond de Rothschild. L'homme qui racheta la Terre sainte) by Elizabeth Antébi (2003) Editions du Rocher 
 The Rothschild Gardens by Miriam Louisa Rothschild (1996) Harry N. Abrams, Inc.  
 Le Sang des Rothschild  by Joseph Valynseele and Henri-Claude Mars is a 576-page genealogical study beginning with Mayer Amschel Rothschild down through both male and female lines. (2004) ICC Editions, Paris
 The Life and Legacy of Baroness Betty de Rothschild  by Laura Schor (2006) Peter Lang Publishing

External links
 Website for groupe LCF Rothschild (English language)
 Website for Rothschild & Cie Banque (French language)
 French government Archives for de Rothschild Frères (French language)
 The Rothschild Archive - an international centre in London for research into the history of the Rothschild family. (English language)
 The Musical Associations of the Rothschild Family by Charlotte Henriette de Rothschild

French business families
French railway entrepreneurs
French Jewish families
Jewish French history